Stoke-on-Trent Rugby Union Football Club is a rugby union club located to the east of Barlaston near Stoke-on-Trent, Staffordshire. The first XV currently play in Midlands 1 West, a sixth tier league in the English rugby union system.

Early league history
When league rugby was introduced in 1987, Stoke-on-Trent was placed in Midlands Division 1 and won promotion to Area 4 North in their first season. However, after two seasons they were relegated back to tier 5, having narrowly escaped relegation the previous season and in their relegation season of 1989-90 they lost every league game. They won immediate promotion back to Area 4 North and stayed there until they were placed in a new fifth tier - Courage League Division 5 - following a league structure by the RFU. They remained in the North Division until another restructure in 1996 saw them move back to the fourth tier - National 4 North - but after just a single season they were relegated to Midlands Division 1.

Club honours
Midlands Division 1 champions (2): 1987–88, 1991–92
Staffordshire Senior Cup winners (2): 1992–93, 1995–96
Midlands 3 West (north v south) promotion play-off winners (2): 2002–03, 2007–08
Midlands 2 West (North) champions: 2011–12

References

External links
  Official club site

English rugby union teams
Rugby union in Staffordshire
Stoke-on-Trent